The 2000 Team China Four Nations Tournament was the second edition of the Four Nations Tournament, an official international football tournament hosted by the Chinese Football Association and International Sport and Leisure (ISL). It was held from 1 to 3 September 2000 in Shanghai, China.

Participants 
Four participants were determined in July 2000 after Japan, Iran and Kuwait declined the invitation.

  (host)

Venues

Matches 
All times are local, CST (UTC+8).

Bracket

Semi-finals

Third-place playoff

Final

Statistics

Goalscorers

References 

Four Nations Tournament (China)
2000 in association football
Sports competitions in Shanghai
2000 in Chinese football
September 2000 sports events in Asia
International association football competitions hosted by China